This is a list of Morten Harket awards. For his awards with a-ha see List of a-ha awards.

Awards

Royal Norwegian Order of St. Olav

The three members of a-ha, Morten Harket, Magne Furuholmen and Paul Waaktaar Savoy, were appointed Knights of the 1st Class of the Royal Norwegian Order of St. Olav for their contribution to Norwegian music.
The Royal Norwegian Order of St. Olav is granted as a reward for distinguished services to their country and mankind.
The official ceremony took place on 6 November 2012.

14 August komiteen / August 14th  committee

Clean Tech Media Awards

Spellemannprisen

Giffoni Film Festival

References

Harket, Morten